Countess Eleonore Batthyány-Strattmann (29 May 1673 – 24 November 1741) was a Viennese Court lady. The daughter of Imperial Court Chancellor Count Theodor Heinrich von Strattmann, she was married to Hungarian nobleman and Ban of Croatia Ádám II Batthyány until his early death in 1703. For more than twenty years after becoming a widow she was Prince Eugene of Savoy confidante, companion and some have suggested Éminence grise. One of the most respected women in 18th century Viennese society, she was known as 'Beautiful Lori'.

Early life and family
Countess Eleonore Magdalena Ursula von Strattmann was born in 1673 in the Palatinate, the daughter of Imperial Minister Theodor von Strattman and his first wife Marie Mechtilde Freiin von Mollard. The Strattmann were a German noble family from the Duchy of Cleve where Eleonore's father was in the service of the Electorate of Brandenburg. In 1683 the family had moved to Vienna, where Theodor had arranged Emperor Leopold I's third marriage to Eleonore Magdalene of Neuburg. In 1685 Theodor von Strattman was raised to the rank of count by Emperor Leopold I and appointed Austrian court chancellor,  the functional Habsburg foreign minister. Eleonore had five brothers and two sisters.

Eleonore married Count Adam II. Batthyány (1662-1703) on the 25th November 1692, the Batthyány Family were like many Hungarian aristocrats loyal to the Habsburg dynasty and served in the Habsburg military conflicts against the Ottoman Empire. Count Ádám II Batthyány came from Németújvár in the frontier region of Austria and the Kingdom of Hungary, after he had rendered outstanding and valuable military service to Emperor Leopold I, most notably during the Siege of Stuhlweissenberg and the Siege of Buda in 1686 where he fought alongside a young Prince Eugene; in 1693 Adam became Ban of Croatia and was rewarded with the Bóly Estate in the year 1700.

After Adam died at a young age on 26 August 1703, Eleonore, who survived her husband for almost 40 years, look after the extensive Batthyány property and took over the guardianship of their two sons Ludwig Ernst (b.1696) and Karl Josef (b.1697). The Stranmann Palace was built by the famous Baroque master builder Johann Bernhard Fischer von Erlau, her father's estates, after his death, were merged with those of the Batthyány family. Her residence was Rechnitz Castle, at the time in Hungary, after she sold another Batthyány building in Vienna, the palace at Renngasse 4, to the Bishop of Bamberg.

Very active and respected in  Imperial Viennese society, Eleonore Batthyány-Stratmann became one of the most esteemed women at court where she was known as:  (The Beautiful Lori) as she was often described as an extremely attractive beauty. Her correspondence characterises Eleonore as a self-confident woman who knew very well what she wanted and who seeks to enhance her knowledge with strength and determination. Eleonore had a brother called Heinrich Stratmann (1662-1707), after his early death he left a widow with the same first name as hers, Eleonore (1677-1738), daughter of the Imperial Field Marshal and Commander Schellart von Obbendorf.

Eugene's Egeria
Eleonore Batthyány-Strattmann never remarried but was Prince Eugene of Savoy closest companion and some have said mistress. Eugene was, for the last twenty years of his life, a guest at Rechnitz Castle as well as Eleonore's Vienna palace which was very close to his Winter Palace. Eugene and Eleonore met almost every day till his death in 1736. Prince Eugene had known the Strattmann family for years, as he and Eleonore's father, the court chancellor, had, incidentally, arrived in Vienna at the same time in 1683. It is not known precisely when their relationship began, but his acquisition of a property in Hungary after the Battle of Zenta, near Eleonore's Rechnitz Castle, made them neighbours.

Maria Theresa called Eleonore's children "Eugene's codicils". Some Viennese gossips suggested that he was the father of the Countess two sons. In the years immediately following the War of the Spanish Succession Eleonore began to be mentioned regularly in diplomatic correspondence as “Eugene's Egeria”, the soulmate of Prince Eugene, and the lady of his heart. When asked if she and the Prince would marry, Countess Batthyány replied: "I love him too well for that, I would rather have a bad reputation that deprive him of his". It has been said that it is through her influence on Eugene that, after the Peace of Passarowitz, Hungary was spared another "coup d'etat", her great influence on Prince Eugene is mentioned by the Duke of Richelieu  in his memoirs. Prince Eugene spent his last evening playing cards with the Countess, he died on 21 April 1736. Countess Batthyány-Strattmann lived the rest of her life quietly in Vienna, she died on 24 November 1741.

Issue
Ádám II and Eleonore had two children: Ludwig (Lajos) and Karl Josef (Károly József)
 Ludwig Ernst Batthyány (1696–1765), Hungarian Court Chancellor and Palatine of Hungary. Married to Theresia Countess Kinsky von Wchinitz and Tettau.
 Karl Josef Batthyány (1697–1772), Field marshal, Ban of Croatia and Chief Chamberlain. He took part in the campaign against the Ottoman Empire under Prince Eugene. Empress Maria Theresa elevated him to the rank of prince (imperial title) on 3 January  1764. Married to Maria Anna Barbara von Waldstein, then to Maria Theresa Countess von Strattmann, and finally to Maria Antonia Nemetujvari Countess Batthyány.
In 1755, 14 years after her death, her sons Ludwig Ernst and Carl Joseph obtained the imperial concession to pass on the hyphenated double surname Batthyány-Strattmann to their descendants, in consideration of their mother's dominant role in their inheritance.

References

Citations

Sources

External links
 Batthyány's family website
 Directory of the Batthyány family with biographical data

1673 births
1741 deaths
18th-century women of the Holy Roman Empire
18th-century Austrian people
17th-century women of the Holy Roman Empire
17th-century Austrian people
German countesses
Hungarian nobility
Nobility from Vienna